Trap House 5 is a mixtape by American rapper Gucci Mane. The mixtape serves as the fifth and final installment in his popular Trap House series. It was released on  May 1, 2015 by 1017 Records and RBC Records. The mixtape features guest appearances from Chief Keef, Peewee Longway, Young Thug and Jose Guapo.

Track listing

References

2015 albums
Albums produced by Honorable C.N.O.T.E.
Gucci Mane albums
Sequel albums